The swimming competitions at the 2020 Summer Olympics in Tokyo were due to take place from 25 July to 6 August 2020 at the Olympic Aquatics Centre. Due to the COVID-19 pandemic, the games were postponed to 2021. However, their official name remained 2020 Summer Olympics with swimming events set for 24 July–1 August 2021 and marathon swimming set for 4–5 August 2021.

Swimming featured a record total of 37 events (18 for each gender and 1 mixed), with the addition of the men's 800 m freestyle, women's 1500 m freestyle, and the mixed  medley relay.

Events 
Swimming at the 2020 Olympics featured a total of 37 events (18 each for men and women and 1 mixed event), including two 10 km open-water marathons. This was a slight increase from the 34 events contested in the previous Olympic Games. The following events were contested (all pool events are long course, and distances are in meters unless stated):
Freestyle: 50, 100, 200, 400, 800, and 1,500;
Backstroke: 100 and 200;
Breaststroke: 100 and 200;
Butterfly: 100 and 200;
Individual medley: 200 and 400;
Relays: 4×100 free, 4×200 free; 4×100 medley (men's, women's, and mixed)
Marathon: 10 kilometres

Schedule
Unlike the previous Olympics, swimming program schedule occurred in two segments. For the pool events, similar to the case of the 2008 Games, prelims were held in the evening, with semifinals and final in the following morning session, spanning a day between semifinals and finals in those events with semifinals. The shift of the normal morning prelims and evening finals (to evening prelims and morning finals) occurred for these Games due to the prior request made by US broadcaster NBC (due to the substantial fees NBC has paid for rights to the Olympics, the IOC has allowed NBC to have influence on event scheduling to maximize U.S. television ratings when possible; NBC agreed to a $7.75 billion contract extension on May 7, 2014, to air the Olympics through the 2032 games, is also one of the major sources of revenue for the IOC), so that the finals from the event could be shown live in the United States.

Qualification

Swimming – individual events
FINA  establishes qualifying times for individual events. The time standards consisted of two types: an "Olympic Qualifying Time" (OQT) and an "Olympic Selection time" (OST). Each country was able to enter up to two swimmers per event, provided both swimmers met the (faster) qualifying time. A country was able to enter one swimmer per event that met the invitation standard. Any swimmer who met the "qualifying" time was entered in the event for the Games; a swimmer meeting the "invitation" standard was eligible for entry, and their entry was allotted/filled in by ranking. If a country has no swimmers who meet either of the qualifying standards, it may have entered one male and one female. A country that did not receive an allocation spot but had at least one swimmer who met a qualifying standard might have entered the swimmer with the highest ranking.

Swimming – relay events
Each relay event features 16 teams, composed of:
12 teams including the top-12 finishers at the 2019 World Championships in each relay event.
4 teams including the 4 fastest non-qualified teams, based on times in the 15-months preceding the Olympics.

Open-water swimming
The men's and women's 10 km races featured 25 swimmers:
10: the top-10 finishers in the 10 km races at the 2019 World Championships
9: the top-9 finishers at the 2020 Olympic Marathon Swim Qualifier
5: one representative from each FINA continent (Africa, the Americas, Asia, Europe, and Oceania).
1: from the host nation (Japan) if not qualified by other means. If Japan already contained a qualifier in the race, this spot had been allocated back into the general pool from the 2020 Olympic qualifier race.

Participating nations
As the host nation, Japan received guaranteed quota places in case it would not qualify based on rankings.

  Australia
  Algeria
  Great Britain
  China
  ROC
  Japan
  Canada
  Hungary
  South Africa
  Brazil
  Germany
  Tunisia
  Netherlands
  Italy
  India
  Hong Kong
  Israel
  Ukraine
  France
  Sweden
  Switzerland
  Sri Lanka
  Denmark
  Finland
  United States

Medal summary

Medal table

Men's events

 Swimmers who participated in the heats only and received medals.

Women's events

 Swimmers who participated in the heats only and received medals.

Mixed events

 Swimmers who participated in the heats only and received medals.

Records broken

Men

Women

Mixed 

All world records (WR) are consequently Olympic records (OR).

See also
Artistic swimming at the 2020 Summer Olympics
Swimming at the 2018 Asian Games
Swimming at the 2018 Commonwealth Games
Swimming at the 2018 Summer Youth Olympics
Swimming at the 2019 African Games
Swimming at the 2019 Pacific Games
Swimming at the 2019 Pan American Games
Swimming at the 2020 Summer Paralympics

References

External links
 Results book – Swimming 
 Results book – Marathon Swimming 

 
Swimming
Olympics
Swimming at the Summer Olympics
2020 Summer Olympics events
2021 in swimming